Sherzodjon Yusupov (born October 10, 1982) is an Uzbekistani weightlifter.

At the 2007 World Weightlifting Championships he ranked 28th in the 77 kg category, with a total of 319 kg.

At the 2008 Asian Championships he ranked 5th in the 77 kg category, with a total of 314 kg.  He competed in Weightlifting at the 2008 Summer Olympics in the 77 kg division finishing sixteenth with a total of 322 kg. This beat his previous personal best by 3 kg.

At the 2012 Summer Olympics, he competed in the 85 kg category.  He finished in 11th place, with a total of 350 kg.

He is 5 ft 6 inches tall and weighs 172 lb.

Notes and references

External links
 NBC profile
 Athlete Biography YUSUPOV Sherzodjon at beijing2008

Uzbekistani male weightlifters
1982 births
Living people
Weightlifters at the 2008 Summer Olympics
Weightlifters at the 2012 Summer Olympics
Olympic weightlifters of Uzbekistan
Weightlifters at the 2006 Asian Games
Asian Games competitors for Uzbekistan
21st-century Uzbekistani people